Serralunga di Crea (Piedmontese: Seralonga 'd Crea) is a comune (municipality) in the Province of Alessandria in the Italian region Piedmont, located about  east of Turin and about  northwest of Alessandria.

It is most famous for the Sacro Monte di Crea, a site of pilgrimage and worship close to it.

Serralunga di Crea borders the following municipalities: Cereseto, Mombello Monferrato, Pontestura, Ponzano Monferrato, and Solonghello.

References

External links
Official web site for European Sacred Mountains 

Cities and towns in Piedmont